The thickbody skate (Amblyraja frerichsi) is a species of fish in the family Rajidae found off the coasts of Argentina, Chile, and Uruguay. Its natural habitat is open seas.

Etymology
The skate is named in honor of Thomas Frerichs, the captain of the research vessel Walther Herwig, from which the holotype specimen was collected.

References

External links
 Species Description of Amblyraja frerichsi at www.shark-references.com

Amblyraja
Fish described in 1968
Taxonomy articles created by Polbot